Francis Gardner (December 27, 1771 – June 25, 1835) was an American politician and a United States representative from New Hampshire.

Early life
Gardner was born in Leominster, Massachusetts, Worcester County, Massachusetts, and graduated from Harvard University in 1793. He then studied law, was admitted to the bar in 1796 and commenced practice at Walpole, New Hampshire before moving to Keene in 1806.

Career
Elected as a Democratic-Republican to the Tenth Congress, Gardner served as United States Representative for the state of New Hampshire from (March 4, 1807 – March 3, 1809). He was not a candidate for reelection in 1808 and resumed his practice as well as serving as solicitor of Cheshire County.

Gardner was appointed solicitor of Cheshire County, New Hampshire on June 30, 1806, and served from 1807–1820.

Death
Gardner died in Roxbury (now part of Boston), Suffolk County, Massachusetts on June 25, 1835 (age 63 years, 180 days). His burial location is unknown.

Family life
Gardner was the son of the Rev. Francis Gardner (1736–1814), he married Margaret Leonard on Nov 1, 1804, and they had five children, Susan, Francis, Margaret Helen, Delia Leonard, and Sarah Gibson. His sister Hannah was the wife of Congressman Abijah Bigelow, who served in the U.S. House of Representatives from 1810 to 1815.

References

External links

1771 births
1835 deaths
People from Leominster, Massachusetts
Harvard University alumni
Democratic-Republican Party members of the United States House of Representatives from New Hampshire